Luís Felipe "Pipo" Derani (born 12 October 1993 in São Paulo) is a Brazilian race car driver who is currently driving a Cadillac prototype for Action Express Racing in the WeatherTech SportsCar Championship and is an overall winner of the 2016 24 Hours of Daytona and the 2016, 2018 and 2019 12 Hours of Sebring. Pipo is the son of the late Walter Derani and younger brother of Rafael Derani, both well-known Brazilian racing drivers.

Career

Karting
Derani made his karting debut in 2003, at the age of ten. In 2005, he was champion of the São Paulo Junior Menor Championship.

Formula Renault
Derani began his car racing career by driving in the Formula Renault 2.0 Northern European Cup with Motopark Academy in 2009. He took two podiums at Alastaro Circuit and TT Circuit Assen along with thirteen point-scoring positions to finish seventh in the championship. In Eurocup Formula Renault 2.0, he took part in six races for the same team. He finished 27th with two points coming from a ninth place at the Nürburgring.

Formula Three
In 2010, Derani stepped up to the German Formula Three Championship with the Motopark Academy team joining Formula Renault teammates Kevin Magnussen and Jimmy Eriksson at the team. Derani finished in tenth place in championship points. In 2011, Derani moved to the British Formula 3 Championship with Double R Racing. He finished fifteenth in points with a single podium finish. He also competed in the Formula 3 "all star" events such as the Formula 3 Brazil Open and Masters of Formula 3. 2012 saw Derani remain in British F3 but switch teams to Fortec Motorsport. He improved to eighth in the championship, capturing wins at Oulton Park and Brands Hatch. He also drove in three Formula 3 Euro Series races and finished sixth in the Macau Grand Prix. In 2013, Derani stayed with Fortec but moved to the FIA European Formula Three Championship where he finished eighth in points with three podium finishes.

Sportscars
In 2014, Derani raced in the last two rounds of the 2014 European Le Mans Series, finishing third in the 4 Hours of Le Castellet on 14 September and retired in the 4 Hours of Estoril on 19 October, driving on both occasions an Oreca-Nissan 03R of the Irish team Murphy Prototypes. In 2016, he entered the four endurance races of the 2016 WeatherTech SportsCar Championship for Extreme Speed Motorsports with a Ligier-Honda LMP2, winning both the 2016 24 Hours of Daytona and the 12 Hours of Sebring.

In 2017, Derani signed with Ford to become a factory driver. He raced the first three races of the 2017 FIA World Endurance Championship in the LMGTE Pro class with Ford Chip Ganassi Team UK, claiming a class win at Silverstone. Later, he drove an Oreca LMP2 for Rebellion at the FIA WEC Nürburgring round. The Brazilian also drove at seven rounds of the 2017 WeatherTech SportsCar Championship for Extreme Speed Motorsports with a Nissan Onroak DPi, winning at Road America.

For the 2018 WeatherTech SportsCar Championship, Derani became a full-time driver at Extreme Speed Motorsports, winning at the 12 Hours of Sebring.

In 2020, Derani was a full-time DPi driver for Action Express Racing in the WTSCC. He was leading Petit Le Mans when he and Ricky Taylor made contact, knocking Derani's entry from contention.

Racing career

Career summary

† As Derani was a guest driver, he was ineligible for points.

Complete FIA Formula 3 European Championship results
(key)

American open–wheel racing
(key) (Races in bold indicate pole position; races in italics indicate fastest lap)

Complete Pro Mazda Championship results

Complete European Le Mans Series results

Complete FIA World Endurance Championship results

† As the #3 Rebellion was not a full-season entry, it was not eligible to score points.

Complete IMSA SportsCar Championship results
(key) (Races in bold indicate pole position; races in italics indicate fastest lap)

* Season still in progress.

Complete 24 Hours of Daytona results

Complete 24 Hours of Le Mans results

References

External links
  
 

1993 births
Living people
Brazilian racing drivers
Racing drivers from São Paulo
Formula Renault Eurocup drivers
Formula Renault 2.0 NEC drivers
German Formula Three Championship drivers
British Formula Three Championship drivers
Formula 3 Euro Series drivers
Toyota Racing Series drivers
FIA Formula 3 European Championship drivers
Indy Pro 2000 Championship drivers
European Le Mans Series drivers
24 Hours of Le Mans drivers
FIA World Endurance Championship drivers
24 Hours of Daytona drivers
Brazilian WeatherTech SportsCar Championship drivers
12 Hours of Sebring drivers
Asian Le Mans Series drivers
Blancpain Endurance Series drivers
Stock Car Brasil drivers
Motopark Academy drivers
Prema Powerteam drivers
Double R Racing drivers
Hitech Grand Prix drivers
Team Pelfrey drivers
Murphy Prototypes drivers
G-Drive Racing drivers
Fortec Motorsport drivers
Extreme Speed Motorsports drivers
Chip Ganassi Racing drivers
Rebellion Racing drivers
AF Corse drivers
Action Express Racing drivers
Multimatic Motorsports drivers
OAK Racing drivers
McLaren Racing drivers
M-Sport drivers